Broad Margin is the name given to the private residence originally commissioned by Gabrielle and Charlcey Austin. It is located in Greenville, South Carolina, United States, was designed by Frank Lloyd Wright and was built by local builder Harold T. Newton in 1954. It is one of two buildings designed by Wright in South Carolina (the other being the Auldbrass Plantation).

It was named to the National Register of Historic Places in 1978.

The house is built into the slope of the  lot. It has  concrete walls. It extensively uses cypress wood throughout including its ceiling of cypress boards. The house has polished red concrete floors. Copper tubes are embedded in the concrete floors to heat the house using hot water.

The cypress furniture was designed for the house. The doors and window frames were constructed on-site of cypress. The hardware is solid brass.

The house was documented with photographs and written historical data by the Historic American Buildings Survey in 1988.

References

 Storrer, William Allin. The Frank Lloyd Wright Companion. University of Chicago Press, 2006,  (S.345)

External links

Houses on the National Register of Historic Places in South Carolina
Historic American Buildings Survey in South Carolina
Houses in Greenville, South Carolina
Frank Lloyd Wright buildings
Houses completed in 1954
National Register of Historic Places in Greenville, South Carolina